The 2022–23 Macedonian First League is the 31st season of the Macedonian First Football League, the highest football league of North Macedonia. It began on 6 August 2022 and is scheduled to end on 14 May 2023. Shkupi are the defending champions, having won their first title in 2021–22.

Promotion and relegation 

1Renova withdrew from the First League due to financial reasons.

Participating teams

Personnel and kits

Note: Flags indicate national team as has been defined under FIFA eligibility rules. Players may hold more than one non-FIFA nationality.

Managerial changes 

1.Gökhan Bozkaya was originally appointed as Goce Sedloski's replacement, however he was replaced by his predecessor after losses to Bregalnica and Tikvesh.

League table

Results
Every team will play three times against each other team for a total of 33 matches. The first 22 match days will consist of a regular double round-robin schedule. The league standings at this point will then be used to determine the games for the last 11 match days.

Matches 1–22

Matches 23–33

Positions by round
The table lists the positions of teams after each week of matches. In order to preserve chronological evolvements, any postponed matches are not included to the round at which they were originally scheduled, but added to the full round they were played immediately afterwards.

Season statistics

Top Scorers

Assist Providers

Clean Sheets

Discipline

See also
2022–23 Macedonian Football Cup
2022–23 Macedonian Second Football League

References

External links
Football Federation of Macedonia 
MacedonianFootball.com 

North Macedonia
1
2022–23